Ralph Radcliffe Whitehead (1854–1929) was the founder and chief benefactor of the "Byrdcliffe Arts and Crafts Colony" located in Woodstock, New York.

Early life and influences

He was born in 1854 in Saddleworth, Yorkshire, England.  He was the son of a wealthy mill owner and industrialist from whom he received a large inheritance, which was later used to establish Byrdcliffe. In his earlier years, he attended school at Harrow.  Later, he graduated from Balliol College, Oxford, where he obtained his Master of Arts degree in 1880.  While studying at Oxford, he became a student of John Ruskin, who helped influence Whitehead's interest in a utopian society based upon art, craftsmanship, and unity.  These views were further developed by his friendship with William Morris, who was the principal exponent of the European Arts and Crafts Movement. Oxford was also the place where Whitehead met his future wife.

Move to America

In 1892, he left England for America.  Shortly after arriving, he was married (for the second time, having divorced his first wife) to Jane Byrd McCall of Philadelphia, Pennsylvania.  McCall had also been a student of John Ruskin, which is where they had first met. Her support and similar interests encouraged Whitehead's desire for a community centered on the arts and crafts movement.  Together, the two attempted to create such a society in Italy, California, and Oregon in turn, all of which were failures.  Finally in 1903, with the aid of friends Hervey White and Bolton Brown, the two succeeded in building their colony in the Hudson Valley.

Byrdcliffe

Byrdcliffe (a name coined from a combination of his and his wife's middle names) occupied  in Woodstock, New York and quickly became a haven for artists known and unknown, representing all of his stated beliefs. It stood as a "rural, utopian ideal based on the brotherhood of artistic collaboration" and focused on the "art of living through creative manual work."  But, despite Byrdcliffe's immediate success and future influence in developing the Woodstock area, the colony ultimately failed.  Many causes have been cited, including Whitehead's own lack of artistic ability (which tended to set him apart from the residents), and his failure to export or promote what the community created. By the mid-1920s, residents began to leave.  In 1928, his oldest son died a tragic death. Shortly after, Whitehead died from the effect, it is said, of his losses.

See also
Byrdcliffe Colony

External links
Albany Institute of History and Art, Byrdcliffe exhibit
Woodstock Guild
Winterthur Museum, Delaware
Art Folks, reprint of article from "Kaatskill Life" magazine.
Antiques and the Arts, Byrdcliffe collection

Founders of utopian communities
1854 births
1929 deaths
People from Saddleworth